Carlijn Welten (born 30 October 1987) is a Dutch field hockey player, born in Utrecht but grown up and living in Heerlen, who plays as a forward for Dutch club Stichtse Cricket en Hockey Club. She also plays for the Netherlands national team and she was part of the Dutch squad that became 2007 Champions Trophy winner.

References

1987 births
Living people
Dutch female field hockey players
Sportspeople from Utrecht (city)
Sportspeople from Heerlen
Female field hockey forwards
SCHC players
21st-century Dutch women